Károly Rémi (1 May 1891 – 20 December 1914) was a Hungarian water polo player. He competed in the men's tournament at the 1912 Summer Olympics.

References

1891 births
1914 deaths
Hungarian male water polo players
Olympic water polo players of Hungary
Water polo players at the 1912 Summer Olympics
Water polo players from Budapest